is a 1973 Japanese film directed by Yoshishige Yoshida. It is based on the life of Ikki Kita. It was Japan's submission to the 46th Academy Awards for the Academy Award for Best Foreign Language Film but it was not accepted as a nominee.

Cast
 Rentarō Mikuni as Kazuki Kitamura
 Yasuyo Matsumura as Suzu, Kazuki's wife
 Yasuo Miyake as Young soldier
 Akiko Kurano as Soldier's wife
 Tadahiko Sugano as Nishida
 Taketoshi Naitō as Army officer
 Kei Iinuma as Iwasa
 Kazunaga Tsuji as Heigo Asahi
 Masako Yagi as Heigo's sister

Plot
The film is an account of the attempted overthrow of the Japanese government by the army on February 26, 1936. It is based on the life of the ultranationalist intellectual Ikki Kita.

See also
 List of submissions to the 46th Academy Awards for Best Foreign Language Film
 List of Japanese submissions for the Academy Award for Best Foreign Language Film

References

External links

1973 films
1973 crime films
1970s Japanese-language films
Films directed by Yoshishige Yoshida
Japanese black-and-white films
Japanese crime films
Films set in the Taishō period
Films about coups d'état
1970s Japanese films